The Goodman–LeGrand   house and museum is located at 624 North Broadway, in the city of Tyler, county of Smith in the U.S. state of Texas. It was added to the National Register of Historic Places listings in Smith County in 1976, and has been a Recorded Texas Historic Landmark since 1962. The Daughters of the American Revolution designated it an Historic Site in 2010.

History
Smith joined the Confederate States Army in 1861 and sold Bonnie Castle to local Tyler teacher F.N. Gary, who never resided in the house. After the 1862 Capture of New Orleans, Gary made the house available to numerous families of refugees fleeing the Union Army.

Gary sold the house to retired physician Samuel A. Goodman in 1866.  In 1872, Goodman's physician son William J. Goodman purchased the house for $3,000 and moved in with his wife Priscilla Gaston Goodman.  William and Priscilla raised four children in the house, and in 1880 added a second floor to the structure. Victorian double galleries were also added on all sides of the house.

The Goodman daughter Sallie continued to live in the home with her husband James Hutcheson LeGrand after their 1893 marriage. The couple was active in local civic affairs, providing their home as a gather place for several charitable and social events. They were ardent supporters of the Tyler rose festival. Their only son died at age 2 in 1896. When William Goodman died in 1921, Sallie inherited the house. The LeGrands completely remodeled the house in 1926 to the current Classic revival style. The current semi-circular porticos were added during this remodeling.

Museum
James Hutcheson LeGrand died in 1935. Upon her death on October 12, 1939, Sallie LeGrand bequeathed the house and all her personal journals to the City of Tyler. It officially became the city's property in 1940. In 1962, the house became a Recorded Texas Historic Landmark. In 1976, the house was placed on the National Register of Historic Places Listings in Smith County. The Daughters of the American Revolution designated the house a national Historic Site in 2010. A major renovation of the house was begun in 2010 and was completed in 2011.

Hours, admission
The house and grounds are maintained by the City of Tyler. The museum is open to the walk-in public 10 a.m. – 4 p.m,.five days a week. It is closed on Sunday and Monday. The LeGrand Park & Gardens is open to the public 8 a.m. – 5 p.m, seven days a week. Admission is free, but a donation is suggested.

Gallery

See also

Carnegie History Center
Cotton Belt Depot Train Museum
List of museums in East Texas
Tyler Museum of Art
Whitaker–McClendon House
National Register of Historic Places listings in Smith County, Texas
Recorded Texas Historic Landmarks in Smith County

References

Museums in Tyler, Texas
Historic house museums in Texas
Houses on the National Register of Historic Places in Texas
Recorded Texas Historic Landmarks
Houses in Smith County, Texas
National Register of Historic Places in Smith County, Texas